"Dive to Blue" is the tenth single by L'Arc-en-Ciel, released on March 25, 1998. The single topped the Oricon charts for two weeks. It was re-released on August 30, 2006.

Track listing

Chart positions

References

1998 singles
L'Arc-en-Ciel songs
Oricon Weekly number-one singles
Songs written by Hyde (musician)
Songs written by Tetsuya (musician)
1998 songs
Ki/oon Music singles